Taepodong (meaning "large watery place") may refer to various topics, each related to northeastern Korea:
 Taepo-dong (in some sources called "Musudan-ri", reflecting Japanese interest and/or control in the latter-19th early-20th centuries), North-Korean-government rocket launching facility located in an area now known as Taepo-dong
 Missiles of North Korea:
 Taepodong-1 (tested in 1998)
 Taepodong-2 (ICBM tested in 2006)